Forrest Clare "Phog" Allen (November 18, 1885 – September 16, 1974) was an American basketball coach. Known as the "Father of Basketball Coaching," he served as the head basketball coach at Baker University (1905–1908), the University of Kansas (1907–1909, 1919–1956), Haskell Institute—now Haskell Indian Nations University (1908–1909), and Warrensburg Teachers College—now the University of Central Missouri (1912–1919), compiling a career college basketball record of 746–264. In his 39 seasons at the helm of the Kansas Jayhawks men's basketball program, his teams won 24 conference championships and three national titles.

The Helms Athletic Foundation retroactively recognized Allen's 1921–22 and 1922–23 Kansas teams as national champions. Allen's 1951–52 squad won the 1952 NCAA tournament and his Jayhawks were runners-up in the NCAA Tournament in 1940 and 1953. His 590 wins are the most of any coach in the history of the storied Kansas basketball program.

Allen attended the University of Kansas, having already acquired the nickname "Phog" for the distinctive foghorn voice he had as a baseball umpire. 

He lettered in baseball and basketball, the latter under James Naismith, the inventor of the game. Allen served as the head football coach at Warrensburg Teachers College from 1912 to 1917 and at Kansas for one season in 1920, amassing a career college football record of 34–19–3. He also coached baseball at Kansas for two seasons, in 1941 and 1942, tallying a mark of 6–17–1, and was the university's athletic director from 1919 to 1937.

Allen was inducted into the Naismith Memorial Basketball Hall of Fame with the inaugural class of 1959.The home basketball arena at the University of Kansas, Allen Fieldhouse, was named in his honor when it opened in 1955. His final season at Kansas was the first full season the Jayhawks played at Allen Fieldhouse.

In addition to coaching basketball, baseball, and American football, he was a college athletics administrator and osteopathic physician.

Early life
Allen was born in the town of Jamesport, Missouri. His father, William Allen, was among the 30 people who originally incorporated Jameson, Missouri in 1879 and the doctor who delivered Allen lived in James. However, he had strong ties to Jamesport where he was town clerk, collector, and constable. His family later moved to Independence, Missouri.

Playing and coaching career
Allen coached at William Chrisman High School (then known as Independence High School) in Independence, Missouri, the University of Kansas, Baker University, Haskell Institute, and Warrensburg Teachers College in Warrensburg, Missouri.

Allen began classes at the University of Kansas in 1904, where he lettered three years in basketball under James Naismith's coaching, and two years in baseball. In 1905 he also played for the Kansas City Athletic Club.

At Kansas he was a member of Phi Kappa Psi Fraternity. Allen launched his coaching career at his alma mater in 1907, but took a hiatus after graduating in 1909 to study osteopathic medicine at Central College of Osteopathy in Kansas City, Missouri. Known as “Doc” to his players and students, he was reputed to be a colorful figure on the University of Kansas campus, coaching all sports and becoming known for his osteopathic manipulation techniques for ailing athletes.

Allen was a legend in the field of treatment of athletic injuries and benefited a long list of high-profile performers. He also had a successful private osteopathic practice, and many he treated, the famous and otherwise, contended he had a "magic touch" for such ailments as bad backs, knees and ankles. He said he applied the same treatments to "civilians" as he did to his athletes.

His forceful, yet reasonable, disposition helped him become the driving force behind the acceptance of basketball as an official Olympic sport at the 1936 Summer Olympic Games. Allen later worked as an assistant coach in the 1952 Summer Olympics, helping to lead the United States to the gold medal in Helsinki, Finland.

He coached college basketball for 50 seasons, and compiled a 746–264 record, retiring with the all-time record for most coaching wins in college basketball history at the time. During his tenure at Kansas, Allen coached Dutch Lonborg, Adolph Rupp, Ralph Miller and Dean Smith, all future Hall of Fame coaches. He also coached John Bunn, who is a member of the Hall of Fame and did go on to coach at Stanford, but he is honored as a contributor to the game of basketball. 

Additional former players that make up Allen's coaching tree who coached at the collegiate level but are not enshrined in the Hall of Fame include Frosty Cox, George E. Rody, Andrew McDonald, Charlie T. Black, Howard Engleman and his replacement upon retirement Dick Harp. Among the Hall of Fame players he coached were Paul Endacott, Bill Johnson, and Clyde Lovellette. He also recruited Wilt Chamberlain to Kansas, and even coached former United States Senate Majority Leader Bob Dole. Allen Fieldhouse, the basketball arena on the campus of the University of Kansas, is named in his honor. A banner that hangs in the rafters of Allen Fieldhouse reads: "Pay heed all who enter, beware of the Phog." He was enshrined as part of the inaugural class in the Basketball Hall of Fame in 1959.

Allen also created the National Association of Basketball Coaches, which went on to create the NCAA tournament.

Head coaching record

Basketball

Football

See also
 List of college men's basketball coaches with 600 wins
 List of NCAA Division I Men's Final Four appearances by coach

Notes

References

External links
 
 

1885 births
1974 deaths
American men's basketball coaches
American men's basketball players
American osteopathic physicians
Baker Wildcats men's basketball coaches
Basketball coaches from Missouri
Basketball players from Missouri
Burials in Kansas
Central Missouri Mules and Jennies athletic directors
Central Missouri Mules basketball coaches
Central Missouri Mules football coaches
College men's basketball head coaches in the United States
Haskell Indian Nations Fighting Indians men's basketball coaches
Kansas Jayhawks athletic directors
Kansas Jayhawks baseball coaches
Kansas Jayhawks baseball players
Kansas Jayhawks football coaches
Kansas Jayhawks men's basketball coaches
Kansas Jayhawks men's basketball players
Naismith Memorial Basketball Hall of Fame inductees
National Collegiate Basketball Hall of Fame inductees
People from Daviess County, Missouri
Sportspeople from Independence, Missouri
William Chrisman High School alumni